Robert Footes (birthdate unknown) was a Negro league baseball catcher for several years before the founding of the first Negro National League.

He played for several years in Chicago for the Chicago Unions and Chicago Union Giants. During that time, he formed a battery with Big Bill Smith, Frank Butler, and Harry Buckner.

In 1903, Footes moved on to the Philadelphia Giants for a couple years.

References

External links

Baseball catchers
Chicago Unions players
Philadelphia Giants players
Brooklyn Royal Giants players
Year of birth unknown
Place of birth missing
Year of death missing
Date of birth unknown